Lella Ricci (1850 – 7 October 1871) was an Italian opera singer.

She was born in Italy as Adelaide Ricci to composer Luigi Ricci and opera singer Ludmila Stolz (1826–1910; the sister of Teresa Stolz). She inherited musical talent and enjoyed a great success in the Theatre Principe Umberto in Florence. Emilio Usiglio composed the opera La scommessa for her (the first performance was on July 6, 1870, in Florence). At age 21, Lella Ricci was invited by Bedřich Smetana to Prague to sing in the comic opera Crispino e la comare composed by her father. When in Prague she became pregnant (possibly by Smetana) but to keep her career she chose abortion and died due to internal bleeding. She was interred in Olšany Cemetery.

1850 births
1871 deaths
19th-century Italian women opera singers
Italian people of Czech descent